Brezovci is a Slovene place name that may refer to:

Brezovci, Dornava, a village in the Municipality of Dornava, northeastern Slovenia
Brezovci, Puconci, a village in the Municipality of Puconci, northeastern Slovenia